O28 may refer to:
 Oxygen-28, an isotope of oxygen
 Vought O-28 Corsair, a prototype observation aircraft of the United States Army Air Corps
 Willits Municipal Airport, in Mendocino County, California, United States